Bjelasica (Montenegrin: Бјеласица) is a mountain range located in the Biogradska Gora national park near Kolašin, Montenegro.

Features

The entire mountain range divides into four expanses, which stretch from the NW to the SE. Its geological features are of volcanic origins, with smooth round shapes and mildly rolling landscape, differing from most of Montenegro's other mountains of calcareous composition abounding in karst forms, with numerous crevasses and crevices.

The range is bordered by Lim and Tara rivers. It is located in 5 of Montenegro's 21 municipalities:  Kolašin (for the most part), Mojkovac, Bijelo Polje, Berane, and Andrijevica.

Peaks

The massif of Mt Bjelasica has 10 peaks above , namely:

 Crna Glava 
 Strmenica 
 Zekova Glava 
 Kosara 
 Troglava 
 Pešica Glava 
 Strmni Pad 
 Razvršje 
 Potrkovo 
 Crna Lokva

Lakes

Mt Bjelasica is home to 6 glacial lakes:

 Lake Biograd
 Lake Pešića
 Lake Ursulovačko
 Lake Šiško
 Lake Malo Šiško
 Lake Malo Ursulovačko

Tourism

Bjelasica, alongside Durmitor, is the center of Montenegrin mountain tourism. It has the advantage of being easily accessible, as town of Kolašin is situated on both main road from Podgorica to Serbia and on Belgrade–Bar railway. 

As a skiing and snowboarding destination, Bjelasica is home to Kolašin 1450, popular ski center with modern chairlifts and infrastructure. The town of Kolašin is some 10km from the ski center, and some excellent lodging facilities has been built there in recent years.

In recent years, Bjelasica is becoming popular as a summer destination, as it is suitable for ecotourism, hiking, mountaineering and recreational tourism in general. Lodging in authentic huts in katuns is increasingly popular option during the summer. Due to the beautiful landscape, richness in lakes and streams, and ease of access, the mountain has great potential for development of tourism.

See also
Biogradska Gora
Lake Biograd
Kolašin

Mountains of Montenegro
Two-thousanders of Montenegro
Kolašin